Chloroclystis schoenei is a moth in the family Geometridae. It is found in the Kakamega forest in Kenya.

References

External links

Endemic moths of Kenya
Moths described in 2008
schoenei
Moths of Africa